The Diana, Princess of Wales Memorial Playground is a memorial to Diana, Princess of Wales, in Kensington Gardens, in The Royal Borough of Kensington and Chelsea, London.

It was erected after her death at a cost of £1.7 million on the site of the existing Peter Pan children's playground which had been founded in the time of JM Barrie (author of Peter Pan in Kensington Gardens), but it is larger and more elaborate than the original. The design, by Land use consultants, was inspired by Barrie's Peter Pan. Its most prominent feature is a full-scale wooden pirate ship which serves as a climbing area for children, and is surrounded by sand in which they can play.  Other features include slides, swings, and an area designed for those with disabilities, including fragrant plants and sound features (for those with visual disabilities). The playground is an example of a "natural play" concept, designed to stimulate children's imagination, sense of adventure, and to encourage them to challenge their physical and mental powers.

It is at the north western corner of Kensington Gardens, in sight of the Princess's former residence at Kensington Palace. It is adjacent to the Broad Walk of Kensington Gardens.

Further reading

References

External links
 Official webpage on the Royal Parks website, including some photographs.

Memorials to Diana, Princess of Wales
Parks and open spaces in the City of Westminster
Monuments and memorials in London
Playgrounds
2000 establishments in England
Kensington Gardens